Posta is a village in the municipality of Pirna, in Saxony, Germany. It was incorporated into Pirna in 1922. It consists of Niederposta (Lower Posta) and Oberposta (Upper Posta). The place was mentioned for the first time in 1417. It is situated on the right bank of the river Elbe, northeast of Pirna town centre.

References
 

Pirna
Populated places in Saxon Switzerland